Pier Carpi (16 January 1940 – 26 June 2000) was an Italian essayist, novelist, film director and screenwriter.

He was born at Arceto di Scandiano.

He directed such films as Povero Cristo and Satan's Wife.

References

External links

1940 births
2000 deaths
Comic book digests
Italian essayists
20th-century Italian screenwriters
20th-century Italian novelists
20th-century Italian male writers
Italian male novelists
Male essayists
20th-century essayists
Italian male screenwriters
Italian male non-fiction writers